Uma Singh (c. 1983 – January 11, 2009), a Nepalese journalist for the Janakpur Today newspaper and Radio Today FM radio station from Janakpur, Nepal in the Terai region, focused on women's rights before she was murdered for her journalism and close connection with women's activism. According to BBC News, Singh was the first female journalist to be killed in Nepal.

Personal 
Uma Singh was a twenty-six-year-old female who lived in Janakpur, Nepal. Singh was born in Siraha District, Gamahariya VDC, Maheshput Ward 4. Singh's mother's name that was still living name Sushila Devi Singh. Singh was cremated by her nephew, who worked in Janakpur.

Career 
Uma Singh was a reporter for Janakpur Today daily newspaper and for Radio Today FM, which were owned by the same company. She was recognized by multiple things including her articles in the newspaper attacking the dowry system, her home Nepal, and she talks about how fathers who have daughter grant the man, their daughter is going to marry, land and much money after they are gone. Not only did she talk about home stuff but she also talked about woman's rights, the caste system and also about politics. Her job was in her hometown and was told to be in a sketchy area, where people were armed at all times. Singh's manager or boss of the radio station stated that she was, "Very brave and multi-talented" (Brij Kumar Yadav).

Death 
Singh was murdered in her home in Janakpur, Nepal on January 11, 2009. She lived by herself in an apartment that she rented. On January 11, 2009 she came home from work in the evening and was making dinner when 12-20 men came into her apartment and started stabbing her with sharp objects. Singh had many stab wounds on every part of her body. She died on the way to the hospital from multiple stab wounds. Singh had neighbors, but they never heard anything, which means there are no witnesses. At first her killers were unknown but later revealed to be Lalita Devi Singh, Nemlal Paswan, Shraban Yadav, Bimlesh Jha, and Abhishek Singh. Lalita Singh was Uma Singh's sister-in-law, Pawswan and Abhishek Singh were known for criminal elements, Yadav was a district-level activist of the UCPN(M), and Jha was a party activist of the Terai Ekta Parishad. Lalita Singh, Yadav, and Nemlal Paswasn are serving life sentences and the others were "handed down clean chits by the court."

Investigation
The police did an investigation on Singh's death. One reason they did an investigation was because Singh's father and brother disappeared from their home in 2007. They believe that the same people were behind this as they were for Singh's death. After Singh's father and brother disappeared, Singh moved to Janakpur and started  her job at the daily newspaper and the local FM station. She wrote an article in 2008, where she stated, "The Maoists have not returned the seized land in Siraha district even three months after Maoist chairman and Prime Minister Pushpa Kamal Dahal directed his party cadres to do so. Some 1,200 bigahas of land captured during the People's War is still under Maoist control." This was written five days before Singh was murdered. The investigation ended and the result came to be that the killers of Singh were after the family land that Singh had the title to. A life sentence was handed down to the ring leader. Umesh Yadav, also known as Swamiji, who was arrested by police was convicted of being the mastermind of the killing. Yadav got life imprisonment by the District Court, Dhanusa in April 2015. Uma's sister-in-law Lalita Devi Singh and Nemwal Paswan are in the jail already for the same crime.

Context 
Singh's career was ignored by most police officers because it was a possible motive. Before Singh was killed, she told the UN Mission in Nepal, "It is a big problem working in the Terai region." She talked about how society does not accept women. The Chief of Singh's newspaper thought the reason Singh got killed was because she criticized local politicians and the dowry system.

Impact 
After Singh's death, a woman by the name of Manika Jha received death threats, they busted in her windows and marked her door with a cross saying "now it is your turn."  Jha was a correspondent for the Kantipur Daily. Many death threats were given out, one by the name of Shanker Mishra, leader of Terai Madhesh Loktantik Party. He sent this out to Mahesh Kumar Das, a reporter for Nagarik Dainik and news coordinator for Radio Mirchi FM 89.6.

Singh was the first journalist to be murdered in Nepal. She was known because of what she has tried to do for Nepal. Singh was part of being a Women's Right activist and was with the newspaper and radio station.

People in the Mahottari, Salahi, Sindhuli, Siraha, and Sapatari zones are mourning Singh's death and are wearing black bands around their wrists to protest. The Monday after Singh's death all six FM radio stations in Janakpur did not air an entertainment program or news.

After the mourning of Singh, many people of Nepal started protesting for the right to protect journalist, especially women that talk about human rights.

After Singh's death Article 19 stated that "It was emphasized that the lack of effective investigation and culture impunity in Nepal had created a precedent whereby perpetrators see attacks pass without consequence."

People in club Nepal decided to make an award in memory Singh. They called it, Uma Singh Courageous Journalism Award. This award had an amount of 25,000 Indian Rupee and a letter of appreciation.

Reactions 
Koichiro Matsuura, director-general of UNESCO, said, "I condemn the brutal murder of Uma Singh. If Nepal is to uphold the two basic human rights of freedom of expression and equal rights of men and women, it will need to bring the culprits of this crime to justice. This is not only an attack on an individual, but a blow to Nepalese society as a whole."

Reporters Without Borders said, "Our first thoughts are with her family and friends. We ask the authorities to react quickly and to do their utmost to protect journalists in Nepal and to quickly arrest this group of killers. This kind of appalling murder must not go unpunished if the Nepalese press is to go about its work freely."

The Committee to Protect Journalists said it "welcomes the arrest of a suspected mastermind in Uma Singh's murder case as a significant first step However, only a robust effort by authorities to prosecute and deliver a just verdict will help to reverse deep-rooted impunity for journalist murders in Nepal."

A spokesperson for International Federation of Journalists said, "We welcome the conviction of Umesh Yadav bringing the case of Uma Singh's murder to a close. We applaud the local authorities for continuing to fight for justice for Uma and ensure that the perpetrators and mastermind are brought to justice."

References

External links 
 YouTube Video: Slain woman journalist of Nepal

1983 births
2009 deaths
Assassinated Nepalese journalists
20th-century journalists
Nepalese journalists
Nepalese women journalists